Baileya (the desert marigolds) is a genus of plants in the aster family Asteraceae. All are native to the southwestern United States and to Mexico.

They are typically annual, though B. multiradiata may be perennial.
The leaves, which may range from being entire to deeply lobed, mostly occur in a basal cluster. From this arises several flower stems, up to 18 inches (50 cm) in height, usually carrying a single yellow radiate flower each, although B. pauciradiata may have 2-3 flowers on a stem.

Desert marigolds typically have their main bloom in the spring, extending through July. Summer thunderstorms may enable a second bloom in October and even into November.

Baileya species are used as food plants by the larvae of some Lepidoptera species including Schinia miniana (which feeds exclusively on the genus) and Schinia pallicincta (which feeds exclusively on B. pauciradiata).

The genus is named after US microscopist and West Point professor Jacob Whitman Bailey (1811–1857), known for his studies of diatoms .

Species

References

External links
 USDA Plants Profile

Asteraceae genera
Flora of North America
Helenieae